Christine Marie Milian (née Flores, born September 26, 1981) is an American actress, singer, and songwriter. Born in Jersey City, New Jersey, but raised in Maryland, she signed a contract with Murder Inc. Records at the age of 19. In 2001, Milian released her self-titled debut album, which featured the singles "AM to PM" and "When You Look at Me"; the former charted within the Top 40 of the U.S. Billboard Hot 100 and both peaked in the top three on the UK Singles Chart. In 2003, she performed the theme song "Call Me, Beep Me!", for Disney Channel's animated series Kim Possible. In 2004, Milian released her second studio album It's About Time, which provided her first major U.S. hit, "Dip It Low" (featuring Fabolous), which reached number five on the U.S. Billboard chart. "Whatever U Want" (featuring Joe Budden) was released as the album's second single. Both singles charted within the Top 10 of the UK chart.

In 2006, Milian released her third studio album So Amazin'. The album produced one single, "Say I" (featuring Jeezy), which peaked in the Top 30 of the US Billboard chart. A month after the release of So Amazin, Milian's representative confirmed that she had left Island Records due to creative differences. Milian signed with Interscope Records in 2009. A single, ballad "Us Against the World", was released in October 2008.

Milian originally wanted to be an actress. Her first lead role was in the 2003 film Love Don't Cost a Thing, and she subsequently had lead roles in Be Cool and the 2006 horror film Pulse. Milian had a minor role in Ghosts of Girlfriends Past, and starred as the lead role in the straight-to-DVD film Bring It On: Fight to the Finish. Milian has also starred in the 2010 ABC Family Original Movie Christmas Cupid, alongside Ashley Benson and Chad Michael Murray. From 2015 to 2016, she starred in the sitcom Grandfathered.

Early life
Milian was born in Jersey City, New Jersey, and is of Afro-Cuban descent. Her parents are Don Flores and Carmen Milian.

Flores changed her name and adopted her mother's maiden name (Milian) in the hopes of landing a wider range of acting roles. The oldest of three sisters, including Danielle and Elizabeth, she moved with her family to Waldorf, Maryland, soon after her birth. Milian was four years old when she showed an interest in show business, and when her family realized that she was a talented actress, she became determined to pursue an entertainment career. As a child, Milian was "very imaginative and very creative", and watching television and listening to the radio became her life. They inspired her to have fun, and she convinced her parents that she "did not want to be inside the TV", although it took some time to convince them. By the time she was nine years old, Milian had begun auditioning with local talent agencies, shot commercials for Wendy's and Honeycomb, and played the lead role in the musical Annie. Milian's mother noticed her daughter's potential and left her husband and moved to Los Angeles with her three daughters when Milian was 13 years old. Her father had to stay in Maryland and divorced her mother soon after the move.

When Milian moved to Los Angeles, her only desire was to be an actress. She always wanted to be in the record business, but did not know how to obtain a recording contract. During this time, she was a host for Disney Channel's series Movie Surfers, by the name of Tina. After living in Los Angeles for six months, Milian moved into the same apartment complex as songwriter and producer Rodney "Darkchild" Jerkins. Jerkins heard about Milian from a boy band he was working with and once he heard her sing, they began working together. For a year and a half, Milian went into a studio every day and worked with Jerkins, which is where she started meeting people in the record business. She began writing songs at the age of 17 because she needed a demo to help her obtain a recording contract. According to Milian, every time she recorded a song, the producer would refuse to give her the demo, or would write lyrics that she did not agree with. She felt that she had to write a song, record a demo, and send it out on her own.

Career

2000–02: Christina Milian, record deal and acting debut
Milian made her first professional musical appearance on rapper Ja Rule's second studio album Rule 3:36 (2000), performing vocals on the song "Between Me and You". The song was released as the album's lead single in 2000, peaking at number 11 on the Billboard Hot 100, and in the top 30 of the UK Singles Chart. Milian co-wrote and performed backing vocals for the track "Play" for Jennifer Lopez's album J. Lo (2001), and co-wrote "Same Ol' Same Ol'", the second single from girl group PYT's debut album PYT (Down with Me) (2001).

Milian's collaboration with Ja Rule led to a record deal with Def Soul Records, prompted by his affiliation with Murder Inc. Records, an imprint that was distributed through Def Jam, the parent label of Def Soul Records. She travelled to Sweden and recorded her self-titled debut album. The album was released on October 9, 2001 in the UK, peaking at number 23 and selling a total of 101,986 copies. Internationally, the album peaked at number 36 in the Netherlands, and number 98 in Sweden. The album's domestic release was postponed because of the September 11 attacks, which occurred just two weeks before its release date. Her label opted to release it later that year, in the fourth quarter, but as Milian explained, new artists generally do not release their albums during that time. As a result, the album was again delayed until the first quarter of 2002; however, Milian eventually opted not to release it. Two singles were taken from the album, "AM to PM" and "When You Look at Me", both of which charted worldwide. A music video for the track "Get Away" was filmed in Paris, although it was not officially released as a single.

The critical response to the album was mixed to generally positive. Imran Ahmed of the New Musical Express predicted that based on the record, "genius can't be more than a few albums away". Contrastingly, entertainment.ie writer Andrew Lynch suggested that Milian needed original ideas. Milian believed that the public expected "a certain thing" from her when she first appeared with Ja Rule, however she wanted to record the type of music she was signed to do. She said that "AM to PM" was a "cool record," but it was not what the public expected. Milian approached the executives at her record company, Island Def Jam, and "cussed them all out", telling them that they were not listening to her. She felt that she had gained their respect by explaining that she was serious about her musical career. In the following years, she was featured on the track "It's All Gravy", a duet with British rapper Romeo, which was a UK top ten hit; provided the theme song for the hit Disney Channel animated series Kim Possible, "Call Me, Beep Me!"; and collaborated with Hilary Duff on Duff's Christmas album Santa Claus Lane (2002), on the song "I Heard Santa on the Radio".

Although Milian is best known for her singing career, she originally wanted to be an actress. When asked whether she prefers singing or acting, Milian said that "they're both my passion. But, honestly, if I had to choose, it would probably be my music. I love writing. I love listening. I love the challenge of it." Milian has also stated that she loves "performing live on the stage ... above all else. It's my favorite."

Milian's first major acting role was offered by the Disney Channel to join The Mickey Mouse Club; however, she did not accept and opted to star as a reporter on Movie Surfers. During this time, she had minor roles in film and television, including Sister, Sister, Smart Guy, The Steve Harvey Show, Get Real, The Wood and American Pie. In 2002, Milian was appointed the host of the live competitive music series Becoming Presents: Wannabe on MTV, where she met director Joseph Kahn. Kahn suggested she audition for a lead role in the film Torque. Her audition was successful and she played a minor role in the film. She was subsequently cast in her first lead role in Love Don't Cost a Thing.

Milian has been described as a role model to young girls; she has said that there are a lot of people who young girls look up to, but "at the end of the day you have to be your own person and love yourself." Milian worked with the Children Uniting Nations charity, in which she was a big sister to foster children, and says her favorite charity is the Penny Lane Foundation. Milian was awarded with a humanitarian award at The Reign fundraiser from the Elton John AIDS Foundation for being a role model for young children. Milian said, "I've never been rewarded that way and never been acknowledged like that. That was really nice of them, and I was happy I was able to show up for the kids."

2003–04: It's About Time and continued acting

Milian felt that Island Def Jam was confused as to how they wanted her image to be portrayed; one second she was young and singing "AM to PM", and next she was a grown woman singing "Get Away". She realized that the change confused the audience, and that "nobody was buying it". In 2003, Milian's label Def Soul was shut down and absorbed by its parent Def Jam, although Milian was instead moved over to Island Records. After the international release of her debut album, Milian went back into the recording studio. The singer felt that music trends had changed into rock music, hardcore hip hop and tribute songs, and her music did not fall into those categories. Milian decided to stop recording and toured overseas for a year and a half. When she returned to the US, she decided not to release her previous album domestically, and started working on a new album. Milian traveled the world, working with the popular producers Bloodshy & Avant, "Darkchild", Cory Rooney, Warryn Campbell, Bryan-Michael Cox and Polli Paul.

Milian's second studio album, It's About Time, was released in the US on July 13, 2004. The critical response to the album was mixed; the club tracks, most notably lead single "Dip It Low", were praised while the ballads were said to be disappointing. The style and sound of the album was compared to that of Beyoncé and Jennifer Lopez by several critics. Milian later admitted that her new sexy image for "Dip It Low" and the whole album was mainly for shock value. She had to make her way back into the US market, and by choosing a sexier image, she made a name for herself. "Dip It Low" was also meant to show that she was not the same 18-year-old girl in the "AM to PM" video. To create her new image, Milian also decided to change her appearance and lightened her hair. Taking inspiration from Janet Jackson who constantly changed her image, Milian thought to herself, "'When did I like Janet Jackson the most?' It was when she had her lightened hair."

Milian believed that the album was more R&B when compared to her "bubble-gum" pop debut album. The change was reflected in the album's lead single, "Dip It Low", which was more of a club and R&B track than her previous pop release "AM to PM". Milian performed as an opening act on the Usher and Kanye West tour to promote her album. The album debuted and peaked at number 14 on the Billboard 200 album chart and number 21 in the UK, selling a total of 382,000 and 63,708 copies respectively, and received a Grammy Award nomination for "Best Contemporary R&B Album" in 2005. The album's first single, "Dip It Low", became Milian's biggest hit to date, reaching number two in the UK and number five in the US. The single was certified Gold by the RIAA for digital sales, and earned a Grammy Award nomination for "Best Rap/Sung Collaboration". The album's second and final single, "Whatever U Want", featuring Joe Budden, failed to reprise the success of the lead single but reached the top ten in the UK.

Milian starred in Be Cool, the sequel to Get Shorty, with John Travolta and Uma Thurman, and recorded two songs for its soundtrack. She was then cast in a lead role in the horror film Pulse, starring alongside Kristen Bell and Ian Somerhalder. The film was a remake of the Japanese film Kairo (2001), and was adapted by Wes Craven and Ray Wright. Filming took place in Romania, a traumatic time for Milian, where she endured racial abuse and discovered that boyfriend Nick Cannon was cheating on her. Milian has also appeared in two video games: Def Jam Vendetta (2003), where she plays Angel, a mob boss' girlfriend, and as one of the female leads, Carmen Mendez, in the video game Need for Speed: Undercover (2008).

2005–06: So Amazin and record departure
Whereas Milian's previous albums had pop and R&B stylings, she was encouraged by Island Def Jam to target a new audience and release an urban record. Explaining the change, Milian said that one of her main problems was that previous releases would often find mainstream success, but would be relatively unsuccessful on urban radio. As an R&B artist, she wanted to build her core audience–a true fan base that would support her through time–to increase her career's longevity. The main purpose of her genre change was to go back to the streets and add to her core audience. To create a more urban record, Milian had a list of producers that she wanted to work with. L.A. Reid suggested to Milian that she should work with Cool & Dre, with whom she ended up working with as the first people to start off the album. Although Milian was originally supposed to work with several different music producers, she felt that the chemistry they had in the first week was so "instant and real" that she felt she could not get a better "vibe" with anybody else other than them.<ref name="musicmilianremedy">{{cite web|url=http://www.musicremedy.com/c/Christina_Milian/album/So_Amazin-2530.html|title=Christina Milian So Amazin''' Album |access-date=August 3, 2008 |publisher=Music Remedy |url-status=dead |archive-url=https://web.archive.org/web/20071016210543/http://www.musicremedy.com/c/Christina_Milian/album/So_Amazin-2530.html |archive-date=October 16, 2007 }}</ref> Milian ended up working with Cool & Dre on the majority of the production of the album, producing ten of the album's eleven tracks together. The album completed within a three-month period, whereas Milian's previous albums would take six months to a year.

Milian's third studio album, So Amazin', was released on May 16, 2006. The album's lead single, "Say I", featured rapper Young Jeezy. The single saw peak positions of number four in the UK, and number twenty-one in the US. So Amazin debuted and peaked at number eleven on the Billboard 200 albums chart, selling 54,000 copies in its first week and 163,000 copies in total. Internationally, the album peaked at number 55 on the Swiss Albums Chart, 67 on the UK Albums Chart, and 139 on the France Albums Chart. Reviews of So Amazin were mixed; critics felt that while Milian claimed that she was displaying the various sides of her personality, the album could "only [scratch] the surface of who she really is." "Say I" was praised by several critics, and was described as "instantly rousing" and "intoxicating". In June 2006, Milian's representative confirmed that she had been dropped by Island Def Jam. In an interview with Rap-Up, Milian revealed she was dropped a week after her album was released. The singer believed it was a "budget cut", and that Island Def Jam Music Group wanted to spend more money on label mate Rihanna. She said, "it was embarrassing. It was a week after my album got put out. I would be in my room a lot of the time crying by myself." After leaving Def Jam, Milian released her first compilation album, The Best of Christina Milian (2006).

After the production of So Amazin in 2006, Milian began dating Andre Lyon from the production group Cool & Dre. The pair dated until February 2009, when they decided to go on a break. Milian said that they were still really close, and decided to break up because it was "hard to grow together when you live on two different coasts". The singer wanted to take more opportunities and learn more about herself, which she often let go when in a relationship, but felt that she was in a now-or-never situation. Milian described Lyon as an amazing guy, and said that although there was a chance for the couple in the future, she needed to focus on herself.

2007–10: Elope and hiatus
Following her departure from Island Def Jam Music Group, Milian signed with MySpace Records in 2008. She began writing songs and recording in the studio with numerous different producers, including Cool & Dre, J. R. Rotem, The Runners, Danja, Terry "MaddScientist" Thomas, T-Pain, Jim Jonsin and Toby Gad. Milian was featured on the cover of Rap-Ups 2008 Winter issue, in which she announced that the album's title was Dream in Color (later retitled as Elope). A single was released in October 2008, ballad "Us Against the World". It was written by Milian and produced by Madd Scientist. The single, described by Milian as a "cinematic power ballad", premiered via MySpace on October 6, 2008, and was made available by digital download the next day. Milian felt that Madd Scientist "brought the best out of me" while producing "Us Against the World", and "was really able to do some amazing things with my vocals".

After recording songs with the aforementioned producers, Milian took a break from music and started filming Bring It On: Fight to the Finish. When Milian returned to music, she concentrated on promoting her single "Us Against the World", and shot its music video. Since then, Milian said that she became "a little bit more meticulous with what I feel deserved to be on the album", and resumed recording. Songs recorded for the album included the 1990s Madonna-styled ballad "Stay", Euro-club record "Tug of War" and the feel-good song "Diamonds", which featured Kanye West. Other features included Rick Ross on the Cool & Dre produced track "Blissful", and Pitbull.

In early 2009, Milian began working with The-Dream, Tricky Stewart, and L.O.S. Da Maestro, which led to her signing a deal with Radio Killa Records. Milian revealed that aside from "Us Against the World", The-Dream and Tricky Stewart would be producing all the songs on her album. In March 2009, Milian changed the album's title to Elope. Regarding the album's title change, Milian explained, "the definition of elope is to run away secretly with one's beloved. This next album is about taking responsibility for yourself and making your own decisions." In June 2009, The-Dream said that the album was finished. Upon completion of the album, Milian said it represented "independence, not having to answer to any type of 'authority', being a woman at her best and feeling very confident". She said that fans could expect an "edgy sound with lots of strong powerful anthems. Big up tempos, R&B and Pop at  best and two big ballads".

In August 2009, Milian confirmed that she had signed a deal to release Elope through Interscope Records, with a 2010 release date. Originally scheduled to be released in 2009, Tricky Stewart explained the delay, saying "we just got our label deals done, so the reason why some of these projects got delayed had to do with technicalities and things of that nature". The album has been furthered delayed because of Milian's marriage to The-Dream and her pregnancy. In January 2010, Milian said that she was going back into the studio in the summer to record more material. Although the album had already been finished when Milian took a break for her pregnancy, she wanted to "go back and re-do some of the music and make some new songs and find my new inspiration". In October 2009, Tricky Stewart said that another single had yet to be chosen, and that it would be the first single off Elope. Reported choices for the first single include "Zipper", "I'm a Cheat", and "Supersonic".

Milian starred as the main character in the Christmas television movie for the ABC Family channel entitled Snowglobe, alongside Lorraine Bracco. She was to be a leading character in The CW's new show Eight Days a Week as Olivia, alongside Mario Lopez, but The CW decided not to pick up the series due to the Writers Guild of America strike. Milian had a minor role in Ghosts of Girlfriends Past alongside Matthew McConaughey, and starred as the lead role in the straight-to-DVD film Bring It On: Fight to the Finish. and as one of the female leads, Carmen Mendez, in the video game Need for Speed: Undercover (2008).

2010–2014: Return to music, The Voice and Dancing with the Stars
Milian was scheduled to resume recording in July 2010 to complete the album; however, Milian opted to focus on her acting career. Despite the separation, Milian and The-Dream continued to "work together and write together". At the 2010 Los Angeles Fashion Week, Milian performed "Zipper" and "Dip It Low". Milian has worked on a fourth studio album since 2008, but its release has frequently been delayed. At the 2010 American Music Awards, she said it would be ready in 2011. In June 2011, her collaboration with The Jackie Boyz titled Memory was released in Japan. It is set to appear on their album Songs In My Blackberry.

NBC announced on October 27 that Milian would serve as the official Social Media Correspondent for The Voice. The role, previously held by Alison Haislip, saw Milian make regular appearances during the live broadcasts. She will also interact with fans through Facebook, Twitter, NBC.com and NBC Live. She has since left the show.

On February 12, 2012, Lil' Wayne said that Christina Milian had joined Young Money. The next day, a song titled "Mr. Valentine" leaked onto the internet. Milian told Carson Daly on 97.1 AMP Radio. "Yeah, I've signed with Young Money. It was pretty awesome. This weekend we had a big party, a big YMCMB party, and Drake was performing and we were all up on the stage and Wayne got up there and he announced it himself. And so I was kind of surprised and I was like, 'Oh my gosh, this is awesome!'" Milian is currently recording her fourth album. "We're just getting started on it," she said. "I've already halfway gotten there and when my mom and I went to Wayne and we played him some of the music, off the second song, he was like, 'I love it. Let's do this deal.' I have some music that's already going to be on it and the second half I'm working with them now. [...] When they did a little background check, they saw even the songwriting, all that kind of stuff adds on top of, alright, she's an actress, she's a pretty face, she can actually sing, but not to mention she's a songwriter. I thought that was cool that they even saw that. [...] They all get on each other's records, so all I have to do is be home with everybody and we'll just do lots of features."

In October 2012 during an interview, Milian spoke of her Young Money debut: "Wayne just gets his artists, which is great, I have a very one-on-one business relationship with everybody from Mack Maine to Wayne. They're just very involved in the project as far as bringing the music, playing songs, just giving their input. [...] I really want to pick the perfect single though. It's been a second since I've been out musically, so I do not want to fail and I don't believe in failure, so I just try new things and figure out the pieces. That's one thing that's great about Wayne. He's like, 'Work with different producers, take your time, but at the same time, try new things. Don't be stuck on one thing.'" In July 2013, it was discovered that her contract with The Voice would be ended.

In the summer, she collaborated with the Stafford Brothers and Lil' Wayne on the single "Hello" which reached the Top15 on the Billboard Dance charts. In September 2013, Milian became a contestant on Dancing with the Stars (season 17). She was partnered with professional dancer Mark Ballas. She was eliminated in the fifth week, finishing in the ninth place. In July 2014, she announced she'd started work on a mixtape titled #TinaTurnUp. In November 2014, she collaborated with Lil' Wayne on his single "Start a Fire" which they performed on the American Music Awards.

2015–present: "#TinaTurnUp, new ventures, and a music refocus

On January 18, 2015, Milian debuted her reality show Christina Milian Turned Up. The series follows the day-to-day lives of Christina, her mother Carmen and her two sisters, Danielle and Liz Flores. It was renewed for a second season in April, which premiered in November 2015. In March, she released a pair of singles (which were previewed in her reality series), with "Rebel" and "We Ain't Worried", of which the latter was used to promote her "We Are Pop Culture" clothing line. In July, she announced she was going to release a 5-track EP and video set, and was working with director Mike Ho. Also that month, she performed the National Anthem at the 2015 Americafest and premiered a new single "Like Me" featuring Snoop Dogg. A few months later, she released another single "Do It" with Lil' Wayne and changed the EP's title to Like Me. Her EP "4U" was released on December 4, 2015 which includes four tracks and music videos packaged in one.

In 2016, she collaborated with So Solid Crew's MC Harvey on the dance track "We Own the Night" which premiered on August 12, 2016.

In June 2017, she appeared as a judge/panelist on the Fox television show, Superhuman. Superhuman features contestants who possess a distinct, nearly super-human ability in fields such as memory, hearing, taste, touch, smell, sight and more are challenged to push their extraordinary skills to win a $50,000 grand prize.

Starred in the critically acclaimed Netflix romantic comedy Falling Inn Love (2019), costarring Adam Demos. Falling Inn Love was the first Netflix movie to be shot entirely in New Zealand.

 Entrepreneurship 
Milian also co-owns Viva Diva Wines with her mother and manager Carmen Milian, as well as her publicist Robyn Santiago.

Personal life
Milian has been faced with the challenges of being an Afro-Latino,Carolina Moreno. 9 Famous Faces On The Struggles And Beauty Of Being Afro-Latino // HuffPost stating:
I'm Cuban but [people] didn't get it because I was also brown-skinned... Latinos come in all colors, all shades... You should see my mom and her brothers and sisters... We just vary in color, shapes and sizes. But we're still Latinos — that doesn't change a damn thing.

Milian met actor Nick Cannon on the set of their film, Love Don't Cost a Thing, in 2003, and they began dating. After being together for two and a half years, Milian ended her relationship with Cannon in 2005 because of his cheating. Cannon revealed that he refused to stay faithful to Milian because their relationship was becoming too much like a "Christian romance". When Cannon married Mariah Carey on April 30, 2008, Milian said, "regardless of what I felt in the past at the time, I actually forgive him and I'm very much over that."

In February 2009, reports emerged that Milian was dating musician The-Dream. In late May 2009, it was reported that Milian and The-Dream were getting married, and the couple celebrated their engagement party in Las Vegas in June. On September 4, 2009, Milian and The-Dream eloped at the Little White Chapel in Las Vegas, Nevada. MTV reported that Milian and The-Dream would get married again in Rome, Italy, and then renew their vows in the US in front of family and friends. On September 11, 2009, it was announced that Milian and The-Dream were expecting their first child together. On February 26, 2010, Milian gave birth to a daughter, who was said to have "a full head of hair." This was Milian's first child, and the fourth for The-Dream, who had three children with ex-wife Nivea. Christina Milian keeps her daughter in touch with her Latina roots by practicing Spanish with her and cooking Cuban food.

The-Dream and Milian separated in late 2009, only three months after their wedding in September of that year. Their divorce was finalized on October 23, 2011.

In September 2010, Christina began dating James ("Jas") Prince, Jr., son of Rap-A-lot Records CEO and impresario, James Prince. Christina and Jas were engaged in April 2013. Christina moved out of the couple's home on June 19, 2014 and the couple called off their engagement.

In July 2014, it was rumored she was dating rapper Lil Wayne, with whom she attended the ESPY Awards. They later confirmed their relationship in mid-2015 after which they received criticism from their interconnected exes, singer Nivea and songwriter The-Dream. They split at the end of 2015 after collaborating on various singles, videos, and concert dates.

Milian has been in a relationship with French singer M. Pokora since August 2017. In July 2019, the couple announced they were expecting a baby boy together. Their first son was born in January 2020. In December 2020, the couple announced they were expecting their second child together, and a French magazine reported they were married that month. In April 2021, they welcomed their second son.

Artistry
Milian is a light-lyric soprano who has not displayed her voice all the way in terms of upper register. She has only showcased a full voice vocal range from Eb3 to F5. The tessitura and tone of her voice are naturally light in their quality but she has shown in her belts that she can create strong tones. Her vocal style has been compared to Paula Abdul and Aaliyah by critics. David Peisner of Maxim commented on her talent and described her voice as being "silky and sassy." Earlier in her career, Milian was mainly an urban pop and teen pop singer but as she matured and grew her sound later grew to branch out into a more hip-hop soul and straight forward R&B sound on her later two releases It's About Time and So Amazin'.

Milian described the sound of the album as "hip hop under-toned with nice, pop melodies", and later said the genre of the album was "bubble-gum pop". She described lead single "AM to PM" as a "very pop" and "fun, party/club song". The genre of the album was described by one critic as "light-hearted, energetic R&B pop tunes". Sonically, the album was said to stick "rigidly to the sherbert-snorting pop formula of Britney Spears and Christina Aguilera". One reviewer compared Milian to other singers of her generation, and found that "while Spears has gone raunchy with 'I Love Rock 'n' Roll', Christina Aguilera down and dirty on Stripped, and even clean-cut Mandy Moore has brashly cut her hair Felicity-style, Milian still seems young and real." The critic also compared Milian to Beyoncé, "while Beyonce is shaking her bootylicious body like crazy on 'Crazy In Love', Milian is simply enjoying becoming a young star."
"It's About Time" Compared to her "bubble-gum pop" debut album, Milian described the genre of It's About Time as more R&B. Discussing the change of genre between her lead singles, Milian said that the "first single off my last album, 'AM to PM', was more of a kiddie kind of thing, very pop. [Dip It Low] is more R&B, kind of a club/party kind of vibe." An issue Milian had with the album was that it did not flow. The various pop and urban influences in that album, she found, confused the audience. For her next studio album, Milian said that she wanted a more consistent feel.

Other ventures
In 2010, Milian signed an Australian music duo, Kasey Osborne and Kelsey-Maree, as their manager. Milian said, "the girls have everything it takes to be the biggest international pop duo out there. The world is definitely ready for these beautiful girls to hit the stage and kill it on screen." She said that the duo were the "most exciting project" she had worked on.

Discography

 Christina Milian (2001)
 It's About Time (2004)
 So Amazin''' (2006)

Filmography

Film

Television

Video games

Awards and nominations

References

External links

Christina Milian Artist Information
Christina Milian at MySpace Music

 
1981 births
21st-century American singers
Actresses from Jersey City, New Jersey
Actresses from Maryland
Actresses from New York (state)
African-American women
African-American musicians
African-American child actresses
American dancers
American female dancers
American child actresses
American dance musicians
American entertainers of Cuban descent
Dancers from New Jersey
American women pop singers
American women rappers
American women singer-songwriters
American hip hop singers
American rhythm and blues singer-songwriters
American sopranos
American writers of Cuban descent
Cash Money Records artists
Hispanic and Latino American actresses
Hispanic and Latino American dancers
Hispanic and Latino American women singers
Interscope Records artists
Island Records artists
Los Angeles County High School for the Arts alumni
Musicians from Jersey City, New Jersey
Participants in American reality television series
People from Waldorf, Maryland
Singer-songwriters from Maryland
Singer-songwriters from New York (state)
Singer-songwriters from New Jersey
Murder Inc. Records artists
Young Money Entertainment artists
21st-century American women singers
21st-century American actresses
American women in business
Living people
21st-century American rappers
21st-century women rappers